Vladimir Yevgenyevich Beschastnykh (born 1 April 1974) is a Russian football manager and a former player who played as forward. He is an assistant coach with Rodina Moscow.

From 1992 to 2003, he played 71 internationals, and featured at two World Cups and Euro 96. With 26 goals, was the all-time goal leader for the Russian national team until surpassed by Aleksandr Kerzhakov in September 2014. He  is also the record goalscorer in the Commonwealth of Independent States Cup, with 20 goals for FC Spartak Moscow.

Club career
Beschastnykh's club career that started in 1991, with Beschastnykh playing for Zvezda Moscow, Spartak Moscow, Werder Bremen, Racing Santander, Fenerbahçe, and Kuban Krasnodar. In the 2004–05 season he played for FC Orel in Russian First Division (second-level division after Premier Liga).

On 15 December 2005, Beschastnykh signed up with another First Division club – FC Khimki, a well-funded football team from a Moscow suburb, competing for a place in the upper echelon of the Russian championship.

In May 2007, FC Khimki released Beschastnykh. After playing for Kazakh Premier League side FC Astana in 2008, he retired from playing.

International career
For Russia, Beschastnykh scored 26 goals in 71 caps, his first coming in 1992. Until Aleksandr Kerzhakov surpassed him in September 2014, he was the top goalscorer for the Russian national team. One of these goals came in the 2002 World Cup against Belgium; Beschastnykh also played in the 1994 tournament, as well as in Euro 96.He became the winner Cyprus International Football Tournament 2003

Coaching career
On 16 October 2019, he was appointed manager of Russian Football National League club Fakel Voronezh, with the team in last place in the table. He left Fakel on 5 September 2020.

Personal life
His identical twin Mikhail Beschastnykh also played football professionally.

Career statistics

Club

International goals
Scores and results list Russia's goal tally first, score column indicates score after each Beschastnykh goal.

Honours
 Russian Championship: 1992, 1993, 1994, 2001
 Bundesliga: runner-up 1994–95
 Soviet Cup: 1991–92
 Russian Cup: 1993–94, 2002–03
 DFB-Supercup: 1994

Individual
CIS Cup top goalscorer: 1994, 2002

References

External links
 Vladimir Beschastnykh at RSSSF
 Beschastnykh at Legioner
 Player profile 

1974 births
Living people
Soviet footballers
Soviet Union under-21 international footballers
Russian footballers
Russia under-21 international footballers
Russia international footballers
Bundesliga players
SV Werder Bremen players
FC Spartak Moscow players
Fenerbahçe S.K. footballers
FC Kuban Krasnodar players
La Liga players
Racing de Santander players
1994 FIFA World Cup players
UEFA Euro 1996 players
2002 FIFA World Cup players
Association football forwards
Russian expatriate footballers
Expatriate footballers in Germany
FC Zhenis Astana players
Russian Premier League players
Russian expatriate sportspeople in Spain
Expatriate footballers in Spain
Expatriate footballers in Kazakhstan
FC Dynamo Moscow players
FC Khimki players
Expatriate footballers in Turkey
Russian expatriate sportspeople in Turkey
Russian expatriate sportspeople in Germany
Süper Lig players
Russian expatriate sportspeople in Kazakhstan
Russian twins
Twin sportspeople
FC Oryol players
Footballers from Moscow
Russian football managers
FC FShM Torpedo Moscow players
FC Fakel Voronezh managers